For Happiness is a 1917 Russian drama film directed by Yevgeny Bauer.

Plot 

Zoya Verenskaya and Dmitry Gzhatsky have been loving each other for 10 years, but Zoya does not want to harm the psyche of her daughter Lee, therefore, lovers are still not together. One day, Zoya goes with her daughter to the resort and there she learns that her daughter also loves Dmitry...

Cast 
 Emma Bauer as The girl
 Tasya Borman as Lee, her daughter
 N. Dennitsyna as Lee's nurse
 Aleksandr Kheruvimov as Doctor
 Lidiya Koreneva as Zoya Verenskaya, rich widow
 Lev Kuleshov as Enrico, painter
 Nikolai Radin as Dmitry, a lawyer

References

External links 
 

1917 films
1910s Russian-language films
Russian drama films